A State of Trance 2016 is the thirteenth compilation album in the A State of Trance compilation series mixed and compiled by Dutch DJ and record producer Armin van Buuren. It was released on 6 May 2016 by Armada Music. It charted in both the Netherlands and Switzerland.

Track listing

Release history

References

Armin van Buuren compilation albums
Electronic compilation albums
2016 compilation albums